Facundo Parada Rocha (born 28 January 2000) is a Uruguayan footballer who plays as a defender for Rentistas in the Uruguayan Primera División.

Career

Rentistas (loan)
In April 2019, Parada moved to Uruguayan Segunda División club Rentistas on loan. He made his league debut for the club on 5 May 2019, coming on as a 58th minute substitute for Diego Rodríguez in a 1–0 victory over Central Español.

References

External links
Profile at the Copa Libertadores Website

2000 births
Living people
C.A. Rentistas players
Uruguayan Segunda División players
Uruguayan footballers
Uruguay youth international footballers
Association football defenders